ZAFARI is an International computer-animated children's television series created by David Dozoretz. ZAFARI premiered in July 2018 on FranceTV, NatGeoKids in Latin America, Rai Yoyo in Italy, Sony's TinyPOP network in the UK, Spacetoon in the Middle East, and is being distributed worldwide by NBCUniversal/DreamWorks. It is also airing on Amazon Prime Video worldwide and was a launch title on NBCUniversal's new streaming network Peacock.

Premise 
Every once in a while, Mother Nature creates animals that are born different. In ZAFARI, one of them, a young African bush elephant named Zoomba who is magically born with zebra stripes, is shunned from his herd as they feel he's bad luck. He goes to live with other one-of-a-kind animals in a valley at the base of Mt. Kilimanjaro. There, Zoomba learns he is perfect just the way he is, a lesson that he will eventually take back to his herd and the rest of the world.

Set in a valley at the base of Mount Kilimanjaro, the series follows the story of a young elephant with zebra stripes, and place intelligent tarsier who is often misclassified as a monkey, A giraffe with peacock feathers, a mandrill with penguin feathers, a pink flamingo-colored lion, and dozens more. ZAFARI teaches kids that our differences should not just be tolerated, but celebrated. ZAFARI stars the voices of Mark Camacho, Holly Gauthier-Frankel, Brian Froud.

ZAFARI is the first television show created in a real-time game engine, Epic's Unreal 4.

Cast

Main 
Holly Gauthier-Frankel as Zoomba, a baby African bush elephant with zebra stripes.
Brian Froud as Quincy, a tarsier and Antonio, a lion with flamingo feathers.
Pauline Little as Elspeth, a goose with fox fur.
Mark Camacho as Bubba, a hippopotamus with skunk fur.
Mellody Hobson as Mellody, a mustang with butterfly markings.
 Cindy Davis as Renalda. a black rhinoceros with mandrill fur.
Terrance Scammell as Pokey, a reticulated giraffe with peacock feathers.
Angela Galuppo as Frick, a red kangaroo with tiger stripes, Colette, a spider monkey with parrot feathers and Lulu, a mustang with butterfly markings.
Richard M. Dumont as Babatua, a mandrill with penguin feathers.
Rick Jones as Frack, a koala with cheetah spots, Spike, a rattlesnake with hedgehog spikes, Oscar, a nile crocodile with golden lion tamarin fur and Ernesto, an armadillo with a ladybug shell.

References

External links
 
 

2010s American children's television series
2010s American animated television series
2018 American television series debuts
2010s Canadian children's television series
2010s Canadian animated television series
2018 Canadian television series debuts
American computer-animated television series
American children's animated adventure television series
American children's animated fantasy television series
Canadian computer-animated television series
Canadian children's animated adventure television series
Canadian children's animated fantasy television series
English-language television shows
NBCUniversal
Television series by Universal Television
Animated television series about elephants